The following is a list of Oricon number-one albums of 2016.

Chart history

See also
List of Oricon number-one singles of 2016

References

Number-one albums
Japan Oricon Albums
2016